A free-floating barrel is a firearm design used in precision rifles, particularly match grade benchrest rifles, to accurize the weapon system.

With conventional rifles, the gun barrel rests in contact with the fore-end of the gunstock, sometimes along the whole length.  If the stock is manufactured from wood, environmental conditions or operational use may warp the wood, which may also cause the barrel to shift its alignment slightly over time, altering the projectile's external ballistics and thus the point of impact.  Contact between the barrel and the stock also interferes with the natural frequency of the barrel, which can have a detrimental effect on accuracy especially when the barrel gets hot with repeated firing.  The interference of the stock with the barrel's oscillation harmonics as the bullet passes down the bore can cause the barrel to vibrate inconsistently from shot to shot, depending on the external forces acting upon the stock at the time of the shot.  Micro-vibrations acting during the bullet's passage result in differences in trajectory as the bullet exits the bore, which changes the point of impact downrange.

A free-floating barrel is one where the barrel and stock are designed to not touch at any point along the barrel's length.  The barrel is attached to its receiver, which is attached to the stock, but the barrel "floats freely" without contacting any other gun parts (except the front sight, which is often mounted on the barrel).  This minimizes the variance in possible mechanical pressure distortions of the barrel alignment, and allows vibration to occur at the natural frequency consistently and uniformly, shot-by-shot.

Alternatives include using a stock manufactured from composite materials which do not deform as much under temperature or humidity changes, or with a wood stock using a fiberglass contact area (so-called "glass bedding").  Stocks which contact the barrel are still popular for many utility weapons, though most precision rifle designs have largely adopted free-floating barrels.

References
RifleShooter Mag 

Firearm components